Traffic: The Miniseries is a 2004 three-part feature on the United States cable channel USA Network, featuring an ensemble cast portraying the complex world of drugs, their distribution, the associated violence, and the wide variety of people whose lives are touched by it all.

Production
The miniseries was inspired by the 1989 Channel 4 UK television miniseries Traffik and the 2000 motion picture Traffic directed by Steven Soderbergh.

Reception
The American version was nominated for three Emmy Awards.

References

External links
 

2000s American television miniseries
Live action television shows based on films
USA Network original programming
2004 American television series debuts
2004 American television series endings